Leimbachstadion is a multi-use stadium in Siegen, Germany.  It is currently used mostly for football matches and is the home stadium of Sportfreunde Siegen. The stadium is able to hold about 18,500 people.

References

Football venues in Germany
Sportfreunde Siegen
Sports venues in North Rhine-Westphalia
Buildings and structures in Siegen-Wittgenstein